The 1989–90 NBA season was the 44th season of the National Basketball Association. The season ended with the Detroit Pistons winning their second NBA Championship, beating the Portland Trail Blazers 4 games to 1 in the NBA Finals.

Notable occurrences

The Minnesota Timberwolves and the Orlando Magic entered the NBA as the league's 26th and 27th franchises. The Timberwolves played their preseason schedule at the Met Center in the Minneapolis suburb of Bloomington home of the NHL's Minnesota North Stars. They played their regular season schedule at the Hubert H. Humphrey Metrodome, former home of the NFL's Minnesota Vikings and MLB's Minnesota Twins. They would move to smaller-capacity Target Center for the 1990–91 season. The Magic would play at Orlando Arena (later known as TD Waterhouse Centre and Amway Arena) for the next 21 years.
The NBA All-Star Weekend was in Miami Arena in Miami. In the 1990 NBA All-Star Game, the East defeated the West 130–113. Magic Johnson of the Los Angeles Lakers took home the game's MVP award. Dominique Wilkins of the Atlanta Hawks edged out Kenny Smith of the Sacramento Kings to win the Slam Dunk Contest.
The Charlotte Hornets were aligned in the Midwest Division in the Western Conference. Charlotte would be aligned in the Central Division for good starting the next year. The league had placed the four new teams in different divisions to spread them out over their first few seasons.
After seventeen seasons as the broadcast television home for NBA basketball, CBS Sports aired its final NBA broadcast in Game 5 of the Finals from Portland. NBC Sports would begin a twelve-season run as the league’s new broadcast partner beginning the next season.
This was also the first season that Turner Sports aired games on its, at the time, new cable outlet Turner Network Television; this began a long relationship between TNT and the NBA that still exists as of the end of the 2021-22 season.
The NBA adopted the FIBA rule that game clocks register tenths of seconds in the final minute of a quarter. This rule turns controversial during the season because of clock calibration problems in many venues; following a January 15, 1990, game at Madison Square Garden between the New York Knicks and the Chicago Bulls where Trent Tucker sank a three-point basket with the ball put in play with one-tenth of a second remaining, the NBA mandated clock calibration and prohibited any shot made when the ball is put in play with less than three-tenths of a second remaining from counting unless it is a dunk or a tip-in. The Trent Tucker Rule would be established the following year as a result of this incident.
All three Texas-based teams made the playoffs. This would not happen again until 2004.
This was the last of nine consecutive seasons in which the Lakers finished as the No. 1 seed in the Western Conference. They would not return there until 2000.
Long-time Boston Celtics announcer Johnny Most retired after 37 years behind the microphone. Most was best known for his call of "Havlicek stole the ball!!" in the 1965 Eastern Division Finals between the Celtics and the Sixers.
The Philadelphia 76ers won their first Atlantic Division title since the 1982–83 championship season, and the first in the post-Julius Erving era. They lost to the Bulls in the second round of the playoffs.
Several players from Eastern Bloc countries in Europe made an impact in the NBA. Yugoslavia's Vlade Divac and Dražen Petrović, and the Soviet Union's Šarūnas Marčiulionis and Alexander Volkov were among the pioneering players from Eastern Europe who made the jump to the NBA.
On March 28, 1990, near the end of the 1989–90 season, the Cleveland Cavaliers faced their new nemesis Michael Jordan. Needing the victory to clinch a playoff berth, Jordan set his career high with 69 points in an overtime win and putting a dent in the Cavaliers' playoff plans.
The Spurs orchestrated the biggest turnaround, with rookie David Robinson at center. After finishing 21–61 in 1988–89, they improved by 35 games and won the Midwest Division.
Scottie Pippen becomes the first forward in NBA history to accumulate over 200 steals with over 100 blocks in a season.

1989–90 NBA changes
 The Cleveland Cavaliers slightly changed their road uniforms, replacing the team nickname "Cavs" with the city name "Cleveland" on their jerseys.
 The Golden State Warriors changed their logo and uniforms.
 The Los Angeles Clippers slightly changed their uniforms.
 The New York Knicks changed their logo, adding more orange to their previous logo.
 The San Antonio Spurs changed their logo and uniforms.

Final standings

By division

By conference

Notes
z – Clinched home court advantage for the entire playoffs
c – Clinched home court advantage for the conference playoffs
y – Clinched division title 
x – Clinched playoff spot

Playoffs

Teams in bold advanced to the next round. The numbers to the left of each team indicate the team's seeding in its conference, and the numbers to the right indicate the number of games the team won in that round. The division champions are marked by an asterisk. Home court advantage does not necessarily belong to the higher-seeded team, but instead the team with the better regular season record; teams enjoying the home advantage are shown in italics.

Statistics leaders

NBA awards
Most Valuable Player: Magic Johnson, Los Angeles Lakers
Rookie of the Year: David Robinson, San Antonio Spurs
Defensive Player of the Year: Dennis Rodman, Detroit Pistons
Sixth Man of the Year: Ricky Pierce, Milwaukee Bucks
Most Improved Player: Rony Seikaly, Miami Heat
Coach of the Year: Pat Riley, Los Angeles Lakers

All-NBA First Team:
F – Karl Malone, Utah Jazz
F – Charles Barkley, Philadelphia 76ers
C – Patrick Ewing, New York Knicks
G – Michael Jordan, Chicago Bulls
G – Magic Johnson, Los Angeles Lakers

All-NBA Second Team:
F – Larry Bird, Boston Celtics
F – Tom Chambers, Phoenix Suns
C – Akeem Olajuwon, Houston Rockets
G – John Stockton, Utah Jazz
G – Kevin Johnson, Phoenix Suns

All-NBA Third Team:
F – James Worthy, Los Angeles Lakers
F – Chris Mullin, Golden State Warriors
C – David Robinson, San Antonio Spurs
G – Clyde Drexler, Portland Trail Blazers
G –Joe Dumars, Detroit Pistons

NBA All-Rookie First Team:
Tim Hardaway, Golden State Warriors
Pooh Richardson, Minnesota Timberwolves
David Robinson, San Antonio Spurs
Sherman Douglas, Miami Heat
Vlade Divac, Los Angeles Lakers

NBA All-Rookie Second Team:
Blue Edwards, Utah Jazz
Sean Elliott, San Antonio Spurs
Stacey King, Chicago Bulls
J.R. Reid, Charlotte Hornets
Glen Rice, Miami Heat

NBA All-Defensive First Team:
Dennis Rodman, Detroit Pistons
Buck Williams, Portland Trail Blazers
Akeem Olajuwon, Houston Rockets
Michael Jordan, Chicago Bulls
Joe Dumars, Detroit Pistons

NBA All-Defensive Second Team:
Kevin McHale, Boston Celtics
Rick Mahorn, Philadelphia 76ers
David Robinson, San Antonio Spurs
Derek Harper, Dallas Mavericks
Alvin Robertson, Milwaukee Bucks

Player of the week
The following players were named NBA Player of the Week.

Player of the month
The following players were named NBA Player of the Month.

Rookie of the month
The following players were named NBA Rookie of the Month.

Coach of the month
The following coaches were named NBA Coach of the Month.

References